Sunnanå SK is a football club from Skellefteå, Sweden who in 2019 plays in Swedish Women's Football Division 1, level 3 of women's soccer in Sweden. The club was established in 1939 and the women's division was added in 1974. Sunnanå has played many seasons in the Women's premier division (Damallsvenskan) and hold two championship gold medals (1980,1982).

Sunnanå SK play their home games at Norrvalla Stadium in Skellefteå. The team colours are blue and white. The club is affiliated to the Västerbottens Fotbollförbund.

Current squad 
.

Honours

League 
Division 1 / Damallsvenskan
Winners (2): 1980, 1982,

Invitational
 Menton Tournament (1): 1981

Footnotes

External links
 Sunnanå SK – Official website 

 
Women's football clubs in Sweden
Sport in Skellefteå
1939 establishments in Sweden
Damallsvenskan teams
Association football clubs established in 1939